Women's Combined World Cup 1982/1983

Calendar

Final point standings

In Women's Combined World Cup 1982/83 all 4 results count.

Note:

Race 3 not all points were awarded (not enough finishers).

References
 fis-ski.com

World Cup
FIS Alpine Ski World Cup women's combined discipline titles